Kocherinovo is a town in southwestern Bulgaria, part of Kyustendil Province. It is the administrative centre of Kocherinovo Municipality, which lies in the southern part of Kyustendil Province. As of 2013 it has 2,255 inhabitants.

Kocherinovo is situated close to the left bank of the Struma River; its southernmost neighbourhood Levski lies at the confluence of the Struma and the Rilska River. The town is located 70 kilometres south of Sofia, 8 kilometres north of Blagoevgrad and 2 kilometres off European route E79 and Struma motorway, on the way to the Rila Monastery. In the 1930s, famous Bulgarian poet Nikola Vaptsarov worked in a Kocherinovo factory near the village of Barakovo as a stoker and a technician. 

The town's name stems from the dialectal word kocherina, a derivative of kocher, "pigsty, section of a shed". It is related to the placename Kočerin near Široki Brijeg, Bosnia and Herzegovina and Kocherovo near Gotse Delchev. The name was first mentioned in 1878. In 1974, Kocherinovo was proclaimed a town.

Citations 

Towns in Bulgaria
Populated places in Kyustendil Province